Niangua Township is one of eleven townships in Camden County, Missouri, USA.  As of the 2000 census, its population was 3,356.

The township was named after the Niangua River.

Geography
It contains three cemeteries: Laughlin, Tick Ridge and Union Electric.

References

 USGS Geographic Names Information System (GNIS)

External links
 US-Counties.com
 City-Data.com

Townships in Camden County, Missouri
Townships in Missouri